Mashkovtsev is a small stratovolcano located in the southern part of the Kamchatka Peninsula, Russia. It is the southernmost holocene volcano of Kamchatka.

See also
 List of volcanoes in Russia

References 
 

Mountains of the Kamchatka Peninsula
Volcanoes of the Kamchatka Peninsula
Stratovolcanoes of Russia
Pleistocene stratovolcanoes